= Wave-crasher =

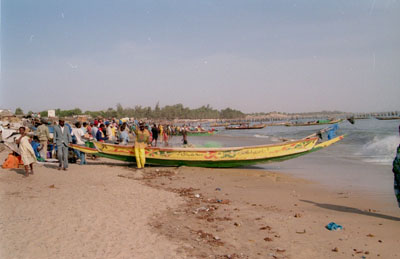

Wave-crashers, or “Mbeukk-mi” in Woloff, are long wooden boats painted in bright blue or yellow. They are constructed in West Africa, more precisely along the Senegalese shoreline (and perhaps Gambia, and some other countries too).

In Gambia they are used as unofficial ferry boats between the capital Banjul and Barra, on the other side of the Gambia river. These boats do not use a quay to moor, instead the passengers are carried from the beach to the boat on the shoulders of strong man.
